Gandahar may refer to:

 Gandahar (film), 1987 French animated film, also known as Light Years
 Çandahar, village in Azerbaijan
 Gandhara, an ancient kingdom once located north of modern India

See also
 
 
 Gandhara (disambiguation)
 Kandahar (disambiguation)